Chupan Mahalleh (also Romanized as Chūpān Maḩalleh) is a village in Khotbeh Sara Rural District, Kargan Rud District, Talesh County, Gilan Province, Iran. At the 2006 census, its population was 849, in 230 families.

References 

Populated places in Talesh County